This is a list of the sections and individual pieces contained within the ancient poetry  anthology Chu Ci, also known as Songs of the South or Songs of Chu, which is an anthology of Classical Chinese poetry verse traditionally attributed to Qu Yuan and Song Yu from the Warring States period, though about half of the poems seem to have been composed several centuries later, during the Han Dynasty. The traditional version of the Chu Ci contains 17 major sections, and was edited by Wang Yi, a 2nd-century AD librarian who served under Emperor Shun of Han. The Chu Ci and the Shi Jing together constitute the chief sources of pre-Qin dynasty Chinese verse.

"Encountering Sorrow"

"Li Sao" is one of the most famous of the works contained in the Chu Ci: it mainly is upon a theme of seemingly autobiographical material about the relationship between Qu Yuan and the leadership of the Chu kingdom. Although often interpreted as a political allegory, other aspects of this rather long poem seem to refer to religious and mythological themes derived from the culture of the Chu area. Source text of Li Sao (in Chinese): 離騷. One piece.

"Nine Songs"

"Jiu Ge", despite the "Nine" in the title, the "Jiu Ge" actually includes eleven discrete parts or songs. These seem to represent some shamanistic dramatic practices of the Yangzi River valley area and other areas involving the invocation of divine beings and seeking their blessings by means of a process of courtship. Text (in Chinese): 九歌

The titles of the poems in Chinese are as follows. English translations of titles follow David Hawkes:

"Heavenly Questions"

"Tian Wen", also known as Questions to Heaven, addressed to Tian (or "Heaven"), consists of series of questions, 172 in all, in verse format. The series of questions asked involves Chinese mythology and ancient Chinese religious beliefs. The answers are not explicated. Text (in Chinese): 天問. One piece.

"Nine Pieces"

"Jiu Zhang" consists of nine pieces of poetry, one of which is the "Lament for Ying" ("Ai Ying"). Ying was the name of one of the traditional capital cities of Qu Yuan's homeland of Chu (eventually, Ying and Chu even became synonymous). However, both the city of Ying and the entire state of Chu itself experienced doom due to the expansion of the state of Qin, which ended up consolidating China at the expense of the other former independent states: including Qu Yuan's home state — hence the "Lament". Text in Chinese: 九章.

Note that poem numbers 1, 6, 7, and 9 actually lack titles in the original text; rather, they are named for the sake of convenience after the first few words with which these poems begin. English titles based on David Hawkes' translations.

"Far-off Journey"

"Yuan You" 遠遊 One piece.

"Divination"

"Bu Ju"
()
卜居. One piece, mixed poetry and prose.

"The Fisherman"

"Yu Fu". Text source (Chinese): 漁父. One piece, mixed poetry and prose.

"Nine Changes"

"Nine Changes" (or "Nine Disputations", or "Nine Arguments"). Attributed to Song Yu. Chinese source: 九辯. Number of individual pieces uncertain. No separate titles.

"Summons of the Soul"

"Summons of the Soul". Text source (in Chinese): 招魂. One piece.

"The Great Summons"

"The Great Summons". Text source (in Chinese): 大招. One piece.

"Sorrow for Troth Betrayed"

"Sorrow for Troth Betrayed". Text source (in Chinese): 惜誓. One piece, with luan.

"Summons for a Recluse"
"Summons for a Recluse". Textsource (in Chinese): 招隱士. One piece.

"Seven Remonstrances"
"Seven Remonstrances". Text source (in Chinese): 七諫. Seven pieces, plus luan.

I When First Exiled (Chu fang)
II Drowning in the River (Chen jiang)
III Disgust with the World (Yuan shi)
IV Embittered Thoughts (Yuan si)
V Oppressed by Grief (Zi bei)
VI Mourning my Lot (Ai ming)
VII Reckless Remonstrance (Miu jian)
VIII Luan

"Alas That My Lot Was Not Cast"

"Alas That My Lot Was Not Cast". Chinese text source: 哀時命. One piece.

"Nine Regrets"

"Nine Regrets". Attributed to Wang Bao, who flourished during the reign of Emperor Xuan of Han. Source text (in Chinese): 九懷. Consists of nine sections, plus a luan (envoi).

I Release from Worldly Contrivings (Kuang ji)
II A Road to Beyond (Tong lu)
III Dangerous Heights (Wei jun)
IV A Light on the World (Zhao shi)
V Honouring the Good (Zun jia)
VI Stored Blossoms (Xu ying)
VII Thoughts on Loyalty Bent (Si zhong)
VIII Raising Barriers (Tao yong)
IX Quenching the Light (Zhu zhao)
X Luan (envoi)

"Nine Laments"

"Nine Laments". (歎 is a variant for 嘆). Written by Liu Xiang (77-6 BCE). Text (in Chinese): 九歎. Nine pieces, each one including a final "Lament", entitled 'Embittered Thoughts':

1. 'Encountering Troubles'
2. 'Leaving the World'
3. 'Embittered Thoughts'
4. 'Going Far Away'
5. 'Lament for the Worthy'
6. 'Saddened by Sufferings'
7. 'Grieved by this Fate'
8. 'Sighing for Olden Times'
9. 'The Far-off Journey'

"Nine Longings"

"Nine Longings". By Wang Yi, a Han dynasty librarian and compiler and annotator of the Chu Ci. Chinese text source: 九思. Nine pieces, plus a luan:

I Meeting with Reproach (Feng you)
II Resentment against the Ruler (Yuan shang)
III Impatience with the World (Ji shi)
IV Pity for the Ruler (Min shang)
V Running into Danger (Zan e)
VI Grieving over Disorder (Dao luan)
VII Distressed by These Times (Shang shi)
VIII Lament for the Year (Ai sui)
IX Maintaining Resolution (Shou zhi)
X Luan

See also
Chinese mythology

Notes

References
Davis, A. R. (Albert Richard), Editor and Introduction,(1970), The Penguin Book of Chinese Verse. (Baltimore: Penguin Books).

Hinton, David (2008). Classical Chinese Poetry: An Anthology. New York: Farrar, Straus, and Giroux.  / .

Scarpari, Maurizio (2006). Ancient China: Chinese Civilization from the Origins to the Tang Dynasty. Vercelli: VMB Publishers. 
Yang, Lihui, et al. (2005). Handbook of Chinese Mythology. New York: Oxford University Press. 
Yip, Wai-lim (1997). Chinese Poetry: An Anthology of Major Modes and Genres . (Durham and London: Duke University Press).

External links

Full Chinese text of Chu Ci at the Chinese Text Project

Chinese classic texts
Chinese poetry collections
Chu (state)